Carex aggregata is a species of sedge that was first described by Kenneth Mackenzie in 1910. It is native to the eastern United States and Canada.

References

aggregata
Flora of North America
Plants described in 1910